Shunde (10 July – 20 August 1519) was the era name of Zhu Chenhao, Prince of Ning, and was used for a total of 2 months.

Comparison table

Other regime era names that existed during the same period
 China
 Zhengde (正德, 1506–1521): Ming dynasty — era name of the Zhengde Emperor
 Vietnam
 Quang Thiệu (光紹, 1516–1522): Later Lê dynasty — era name of Lê Chiêu Tông
 Thiên Hiến (天憲, 1519): Later Lê dynasty — era name of Lê Do (黎槱)
 Tuyên Hòa (宣和, 1516–1521): Later Lê dynasty — era name of Trần Xương (陳昌)
 Japan
 Eishō (永正, 1504–1521): era name of Emperor Go-Kashiwabara

See also
 List of Chinese era names
 List of Ming dynasty era names

Notes

References

Chinese imperial eras